Velazco is a Spanish surname. Notable people with the surname include:

Arturo Velazco, American soccer player
Ferran Velazco Querol (born 1976), Spanish rugby union player
Héctor Javier Velazco (born 1973), Argentine boxer
Ignacio Mier Velazco (born 1961), Mexican politician
Jeny Velazco, Mexican Paralympic athlete

Spanish-language surnames